Xu Qiuping (born 29 August 1984) is a Paralympian athlete from China competing mainly in F37 classification throwing events.

Xu first represented her country at a Paralympic Games in 2008 in Beijing, entering the F37/38 shot put event. Her best throw of 10.21 left her in sixth place, outside the medals. She experienced greater success at the 2012 Summer Paralympics in London, where she won two medals; both silver in the F37 discus and shot put. As well as her Paralympic success Xu has won medals at the World Championships winning a silver and bronze in the 2011 Games in Christchurch.

Personal history
Xu was born in Shanghai, China in 1984. Due to damage to nerves in her brain, Xu is unable to move her right hand. She still lives is Shanghai and is a professional athlete.

Notes

Paralympic athletes of China
Athletes (track and field) at the 2008 Summer Paralympics
Athletes (track and field) at the 2012 Summer Paralympics
Paralympic silver medalists for China
Living people
1984 births
Medalists at the 2012 Summer Paralympics
Chinese female discus throwers
Chinese female javelin throwers
Chinese female shot putters
Sportspeople from Shanghai
Paralympic medalists in athletics (track and field)
21st-century Chinese women